Chapel Town is a hamlet in the civil parish of St Enoder in Cornwall, England  south-west of Summercourt on the A30 main road.

References

Hamlets in Cornwall